St Mary's Football Club may refer to

St Mary's Football Club (NTFL), an Australian rules football club in the Northern Territory Football League
St Mary's Sporting Club Inc, an Australian rules football club in the Geelong Football League
St Mary's Football Club (NFL), an Australian rules football club, based in Greensborough, Victoria, playing in the Northern Football League